VVHS may refer to:
 Valley View High School (disambiguation)
 Valley Vista High School (Fountain Valley, California), United States
 Valley Vista High School (Surprise, Arizona), United States
 Vasant Vihar High School, Thane, Maharashtra, India
 Victor Valley High School, Victorville, California, United States
 Volcano Vista High School, Albuquerque, New Mexico, United States